Karl Taylor may refer to:

 Karl G. Taylor, Sr., Medal of Honor recipient
Karl Taylor (boxer), see Tontcho Tontchev
 Karl Taylor (ice hockey), ice hockey coach

See also
Carl Taylor (disambiguation)